David George Agnew (31 March 1925 – September 1966) was a Northern Irish footballer who played as a goalkeeper. He made one appearance in the Football League for Sunderland.

Career statistics

References

Association footballers from Northern Ireland
NIFL Premiership players
Crusaders F.C. players
Association football goalkeepers
1925 births
Association footballers from Belfast
1966 deaths
English Football League players
Sunderland A.F.C. players
Blyth Spartans A.F.C. players
Northern Ireland amateur international footballers